Notes of Blue in an album by the band Son Volt. It was released February 17, 2017.

Track listing

Personnel
 Jay Farrar - vocals, acoustic guitar, electric guitar, organ
 Jacob Edwards - drums, percussion
 Mark Spencer - backing vocals, bass, piano, Weissenborn
 Gary Hunt - backing vocals, fiddle
 Jason Kardong - pedal steel guitar

References

External links 
 Son Volt official Site

2017 albums
Son Volt albums